Jaime Velez may refer to:
Jaime P. Velez, American recording engineer Don't Let Me Down (The Chainsmokers song)
Jaime Velez (Oz), a fictional character from the television series Oz